Dinner With Osama is a collection of short stories by American author Marilyn Krysl.  The collection won the 2008 Richard Sullivan award for short fiction from the University of Notre Dame.

References

2008 short story collections
University of Notre Dame Press books
American short story collections